Ian William Chubb  (born 17 October 1943) is an Australian neuroscientist and academic, who was the Chief Scientist of Australia from 23 May 2011 to 22 January 2016.

Career
Chubb has a Masters in Science, a DPhil from the University of Oxford, honorary doctorates from Flinders University, Charles Darwin University, Australian National University, Monash University, Sunshine Coast University and Melbourne University.

He was Deputy Vice Chancellor of the University of Wollongong (1986–1990), Senior Deputy Vice-Chancellor at Monash University (1993–1995) and Vice Chancellor of Flinders University (1995–2000).

In 1999 he was appointed an Officer of the Order of Australia "for service to the development of Higher Education policy & its implementation at state, national & international levels, as an administrator in the Tertiary Education sector, & to research, particularly in the field of neuroscience". In 2001 he was awarded the Centenary Medal "for service to Australian society through tertiary education and university administration". In 2006 he was appointed a Companion of the Order "for service to higher education, including research and development policy in the pursuit of advancing the national interest socially, economically, culturally and environmentally, and to the facilitation of a knowledge based global economy".

He was the Vice-Chancellor of the Australian National University from 2001 to 2011.

He is a former president of the Australian Vice-Chancellors' Committee, chairman of the Group of Eight university lobby group, and president of the International Alliance of Research Universities (2006–2009).

In April 2011, Chubb was announced as the Chief Scientist of Australia following the resignation of Penny Sackett from that role.

Named ACT Australian of the Year 2011, Chubb was recognised for three decades of service to tertiary education and university governance in Australia, and internationally.

In 2012 he was appointed a member of the board of the Climate Change Authority.

Chubb's term as Chief Scientist ended on 22 January 2016. Alan Finkel was appointed as his replacement.

In 2022, the Albanese government commissioned an Independent Review of Australian Carbon Credit Units, that reported in December 2022. The independent panel was composed of Professor Ian Chubb AC (chair), the Hon Dr Annabelle Bennett AC SC, Ms Ariadne Gorring and Dr Stephen Hatfield Dodds.

References

External links
ANU: An enduring legacy: Ian Chubb’s leadership of ANU
ACT Australian of the Year 2011

Chubb's doctoral thesis, "Studies on neuronal proteins"

1943 births
Living people
Australian neuroscientists
Chief Scientists of Australia
Academic staff of the Australian National University
Companions of the Order of Australia
Recipients of the Centenary Medal
Alumni of St John's College, Oxford
Fellows of the Australian Academy of Technological Sciences and Engineering
Vice Chancellors of Flinders University
Vice-Chancellors of the Australian National University
21st-century Australian public servants
21st-century Australian scientists
20th-century Australian scientists
Members of the International Alliance of Research Universities